Adelaide Arena (known commercially as Adelaide 36ers Arena) is a multipurpose indoor sports stadium located in Findon, an inner western suburb of Adelaide, South Australia.

It is the former home arena for the Adelaide 36ers of the NBL and the current home arena of the Adelaide Lightning of the Women's National Basketball League (WNBL). In the past, it has served as an alternate venue for Adelaide's Suncorp Super Netball team, the Adelaide Thunderbirds.

Although it can be a multipurpose venue catering to both sports and other events, the Titanium Security Arena is currently the largest arena in Australia primarily built for basketball, and as of the 2016–17 NBL season is the 6th-largest out of 11 venues currently used in the league, though it remains the only basketball specific venue. The arena is also the largest venue currently used in the WNBL.

History
Adelaide Arena has been the Adelaide 36ers' home venue since 1992 and the Adelaide Lightning's home for most years since 1993. The arena was built to replace the 36ers former and now-demolished home, Apollo Stadium, which only seated 3,000 people in cramped conditions.

Despite the arena's ability to host more than just sporting events such as basketball and netball, the Government of South Australia placed restrictions on the venue's use when it opened in 1992. Due to the government owning the Adelaide Entertainment Centre, the arena could not be used for such events as concerts, with most major international musical acts performing at the centre or Adelaide's outdoor venues such as the now-demolished Football Park, Memorial Drive or the Adelaide Oval.

The arena was purchased by businessmen Eddy Groves and Mal Hemmerling in 2006 for A$3.95 million. However, in 2012, the Commonwealth Bank took possession of the arena after Eddy Groves had defaulted on the loan. On 3 April 2013, it was announced that Scouts SA and SA Church Basketball had become joint owners of the arena.

The event restrictions were lifted in December 2014 allowing the arena to host non-sporting events, including music concerts. The set-up for concerts at the arena involves retracting the northern bowl seats to allow for a stage with general floor seating covering the Brett Maher Court. With this setup in place, capacity at the arena stays at 8,000 for concerts.

The arena's attendance record of 8,127 was set on 11 April 2014 to see Game 2 of the 2013–14 Grand Final series when the 36ers defeated the Perth Wildcats 89–84.

In January 2016, the arena undertook an extensive renovation process to upgrade the arena. A newcourt video scoreboard was erected at a cost of $200,000 to replace the old LCD scoreboard which had been in place since 1992; new lighting was also added, along with a new PA system.
The current owner of this arena is Beverley Leisure Park subsidiary company of PELLIGRA

Sporting events

Basketball 
Since its opening Adelaide Arena has played host to 7 NBL Grand Final games in 1994 (1 game), 1998 (1 game), 1999 (games 2 and 3), 2002 (games 2 and 3) and 2014 (1 game), with the 36ers winning all games except the opening game of the 1994 series against the North Melbourne Giants and Game 2 of the 1999 series against the Victoria Titans.

The Adelaide Arena has also played host to Boomers and Opals games against various visiting nations and other touring teams, including the opening game of a five-game series between the Boomers and Magic Johnson's All-Stars, who included former NBA players such as captain/coach Johnson and three-time NBA All-Star Mark Aguirre who top scored with 32 points, on 7 March 1995. In front of almost 8,000 fans, the All-Stars defeated the Boomers (who included 36ers players Mark Davis, Brett Maher, Mike McKay, Chris Blakemore and Brett Wheeler) 113–98.

The Harlem Globetrotters have also played at the arena, the most recent occasion being on 1 November 2013.

The NBL returned to the Arena when the New Zealand Breakers hosted a game against the Adelaide 36ers at the Venue on 12 March 2022.

Netball
When the arena was opened in 1992, the arena also became the home of major netball games played in South Australia, with the state league grand final being played there until 2000. The Australian Netball Diamonds have used the arena for test matches, and from 1997 until 2001 it was the home of the Adelaide Thunderbirds and Adelaide Ravens who played the  Commonwealth Bank Trophy.

See also
 List of indoor arenas in Australia

References

External links 
 
 
 Titanium Security Arena seating arrangement

Adelaide 36ers
Adelaide Lightning
Adelaide Thunderbirds
1992 establishments in Australia
National Basketball League (Australia) venues
Sports venues in Adelaide
Sports venues completed in 1992
Basketball venues in Australia
Netball venues in South Australia
Indoor arenas in Australia